Simaethistoidea is an obscure superfamily of pyralid-like moths with two genera, whose biology and relationships among the Ditrysia  is currently unknown, namely the Australian Metaprotus (2 species) and the China and North Indian Simaethistis (2 species) (Dugdale et al., 1999).

Genera and species
Metaprotus Hampson, 1899
Simaethistis Hampson, 1896

References

Dugdale, J.S., Kristensen, N.P., Robinson, G.S. and Scoble, M.J. (1999). The smaller microlepidoptera-grade superfamilies. Ch. 13, P. 219 in Kristensen, N.P. (Ed.). Lepidoptera, Moths and Butterflies. Volume 1: Evolution, Systematics, and Biogeography. Handbuch der Zoologie. Eine Naturgeschichte der Stämme des Tierreiches / Handbook of Zoology. A Natural History of the phyla of the Animal Kingdom. Band / Volume IV Arthropoda: Insecta Teilband / Part 35: 491 pp. Walter de Gruyter, Berlin, New York.
Firefly Encyclopedia of Insects and Spiders, edited by Christopher O'Toole, 2002

External links
Tree of Life
Australian Moths Online
Simaethistoidea at Australian Faunal Directory

Lepidoptera superfamilies
Ditrysia